Jason R. Armagost is a United States Air Force major general who serves as the deputy commander of Security Assistance Group - Ukraine since October 2022. He most recently served as the director of operations and communications of the Air Force Global Strike Command. Previously, he was the commander of the 379th Air Expeditionary Wing.

He  is the Director of Strategic Plans, Programs, and Requirements at Barksdale Air Force Base in Louisiana. For the nation's Minuteman III intercontinental ballistic missile force, B-1, B-2, and B-52 bombers, MH-139 and UH-1N helicopters, the E-4B National Airborne Operations Center Aircraft, and Nuclear Command, Control, and Communications systems, he is responsible for strategic planning, establishing requirements, and programming advocacy. With a total budget of more than $13.5 billion, he is also in charge of funding and requirements for the modernization and recapitalization of strategic nuclear assets, including the Ground Based Strategic Deterrent and the B-21 Raider. AFGSC equips combatant commanders with combat-ready forces to undertake strategic nuclear and global strike operations, with about 33,700 personnel.

In 1992, He received his commission from the United States Air Force Academy. He has more than 2,900 hours in the B-2A, F-16CJ, F-16CG, B-1B, B-52H, and T-38A, and has served in several operational and training deployments. A fellowship at Stanford University's Center for International Security and Cooperation and duties as Chief of Nuclear Operations on the Joint Staff at the Pentagon are among his significant educational and staff assignments.

He was in charge of the 13th Bomb Squadron at Whiteman Air Force Base in Missouri, the 5th Bomb Wing at Minot Air Force Base in North Dakota, and the 379th Air Expeditionary Wing at Al Udeid Air Base in Qatar. During operations Desert Strike, Southern Watch, Iraqi Freedom, Enduring Freedom, Inherent Resolve, Freedom's Sentinel, and Deliberate Resolve, his operational duties supported contingency operations. He's also flown the F-16CJ, B-2A, B-1B, and B-52H on several combat missions.

References

External links

Year of birth missing (living people)
Living people
Place of birth missing (living people)
United States Air Force generals